J. F. Duthie & Company was a small shipyard located on the east side of Harbor Island in Seattle, Washington. It was reportedly organized in 1911 (although there is no mention of it on the 1912 Baist map at the location where the shipyard would be built) and expanded to 4 slipways on 25 acres of property in World War I to build cargo ships for the United Kingdom, France and Norway, but those resources were eventually all diverted at the behest of the United States Shipping Board (USSB). Work on the new plant started on 10 September 1916 and the first keel was laid on 29 November the same year. At that time, the new Skinner & Eddy plant across the water was already launching its first two ships: Niels Nielsen (21 September) and Hanna Nielsen (23 October).

Some 24 of the 33 ships built at J. F. Duthie were the "West boats," a series of steel-hulled cargo ships built for the USSB on the West Coast of the United States as part of the World War I war effort, with 12 requisitioned and 12 built under contract, 16% of the steel tonnage built in Puget Sound for the USSB. Duthie was supplied with boilers by Willamette Iron and Steel Works of Portland, Oregon.

After the war, Wallace F. Duthie, the son of the founder J. F. Duthie, organized the dismantling of the shipbuilding facilities. Wallace died in 1922 at age 23.

In 1928 the company's name was changed to Wallace Bridge Company. It built structural steel for local projects, including the Washington Athletic Club building in 1930.

Notable ships built at J. F. Duthie & Company 

Among the first 7 boats built, before the Federal Government dominated the shipbuilding industry, was the steam ferry Leschi, which after an illustrious career capsized during Reagan's second term.

In November of 1918, World War I came to an end. In February of 1919, Seattle workers went on strike.

 12 of 111 Design 1013 ships (USSB contracts 224, 334; 3 cancellations)

 For the Coastwise SS Co
 Griffco (Sep 20)
  (Oct 20, last ship built)

See also 
 :Category:Ships built by J. F. Duthie & Company
 Seattle-Tacoma Shipbuilding Corporation#Shipbuilding in Puget Sound

References 

 

Defunct companies based in Seattle
Manufacturing companies established in 1911
Defunct shipbuilding companies of the United States
Manufacturing companies based in Seattle
Shipbuilding in Washington (state)
Maritime history of Washington (state)